Carex argyrantha, the hay sedge, is a species of flowering plant in the family Cyperaceae. It is native to eastern Canada and the east-central and northeastern United States, and has gone extinct in Delaware. It typically grows in rocky woodlands and on sandstone ledges and has potential for use on green roofs.

References

argyrantha
Flora of Ontario
Flora of Quebec
Flora of New Brunswick
Flora of Nova Scotia
Flora of the Northeastern United States
Flora of Tennessee
Flora of North Carolina
Flora of Virginia
Plants described in 1862